Franco Ponzinibio (born July 16, 1914 in Buenos Aires) was an Argentine professional football player. He also held Italian citizenship.

His older brother José Carlos Ponzinibio played for A.C. Milan in the 1930s. To distinguish them, José Carlos was referred to as Ponzinibio I and Franco as Ponzinibio II.

1914 births
Year of death missing
Argentine footballers
Serie A players
Serie B players
Inter Milan players
U.S. Catanzaro 1929 players
Genoa C.F.C. players
Pisa S.C. players
A.C. Perugia Calcio players
Association football midfielders
Footballers from Buenos Aires